Chief Wole Olanipekun, SAN, OFR, [CFR]18 November 1951) is a Nigerian Lawyer and former President of the Nigerian Bar Association and Senior Advocate of Nigeria.

Early life
A native of Ikere-Ekiti, he attended Amoye Grammar School in Ikere-Ekiti, Ekiti State southwestern Nigeria but obtained the West Africa School Certificate at Ilesa Grammar before he proceeded to the University of Lagos, where he obtained a bachelor's degree in Law.

Professional career
He was Called to the bar in July 1976 after he graduated from the Nigerian Law School and subsequently attained the rank of Senior Advocate of Nigeria in July 1991, the same year in which he was appointed as Attorney General and Commissioner for Justice of Ondo State and served in that capacity for two years.
In 2002, he was elected as President of the Nigerian Bar Association. In 2003 he was appointed the vice President of the Pan African Lawyers Union.
In January 2007, he became a Life bencher, appointed by the Nigerian Body of Benchers.
He was the Pro-Chancellor and Chairman of Governing Council of the University of Ibadan between 2004 and 2006. In 2003, he was appointed the Vice President of the Pan African Lawyers Union (PALU). Chief Oluwole Olanipekun, SAN, OFR is the Principal Partner of Wole Olanipekun and Co, a leading law firm in Nigeria with the headquarters in Lagos State, Nigeria, branch in Abuja and presence in all the states in Nigeria.

Personal life 
Olanipekun is married to Erelu Omolara Olanipekun and they have four children (among them Oladapo Olanipekun, Olabode Olanipekun, Bukola Olanipekun, and Temitope Olanipekun) - and is a grandfather.

Membership
Nigerian Bar Association
International Bar Association
Nigerian Body of Benchers

Award 
In October 2022, a Nigerian national honour of Commander of the Order of the Federal Republic (CFR) was conferred on him by President Muhammadu Buhari.

References

1951 births
Living people
People from Ekiti State
Senior Advocates of Nigeria
20th-century Nigerian lawyers
21st-century Nigerian lawyers
University of Lagos alumni
University of Ibadan people